The Bryan County School District is a public school district in Bryan County, Georgia, United States, based in Black Creek. It serves the communities of Belfast, Black Creek, Blitchton, Ellabell, Keller, Pembroke, and Richmond Hill.

It is the designated school district for grades K-12 for the county, except parts in Fort Stewart. Fort Stewart has the Department of Defense Education Activity (DoDEA) as its local school district, for the elementary level. Students at the secondary level on Fort Stewart attend public schools operated by county school districts.

Schools
The Bryan County School District has five elementary schools, two middle schools, and two high schools.

Elementary schools
Bryan County Elementary School
George Washington Carver Elementary School
Lanier Primary School
Richmond Hill Elementary School
Richmond Hill Primary School

Middle schools
Bryan County Middle School
Richmond Hill Middle School

High schools
Bryan County High School
Richmond Hill High School

References

External links

School districts in Georgia (U.S. state)
Education in Bryan County, Georgia